Gnathodus is an extinct conodont genus in the family Idiognathodontidae.

Use in stratigraphy 
The Tournaisian, the oldest age of the Mississippian (also known as Lower Carboniferous), contains eight conodont biozones, 3 of which are defined by Gnathodus species:
 the zone of Gnathodus pseudosemiglaber and Scaliognathus anchoralis
 the zone of Gnathodus semiglaber and Polygnathus communis
 the zone of Gnathodus typicus and Siphonodella isosticha

The Visean, the second age of the Mississippian, contains four conodont biozones, two of which are defined by Gnathodus species:
 the Gnathodus bilineatus Zone
 the Gnathodus texanus Zone

The Serpukhovian,  the third or youngest age of the Mississippian, includes four conodont biozones, two of which are defined by Gnathodus species:
 the Gnathodus postbilineatus Zone
 the Gnathodus bollandensis Zone

References 

 Proposal of Gnathodus bilineatus (Roundy, 1926) as type species of the genus Gnathodus Pander, 1856 (Conodonts). HR Lane and W Ziegler, Senckenbergiana lethaea, 1984

External links 

 Gnathodus at fossilworks.org (retrieved 15 May 2016)

Ozarkodinida genera
Mississippian conodonts
Serpukhovian life
Tournaisian life
Viséan life
Mississippian first appearances
Mississippian extinctions
Fossil taxa described in 1856
Taxa named by Heinz Christian Pander